Hascot Hill Pit is a  geological Site of Special Scientific Interest south-west of Needham Market in Suffolk. It is a Geological Conservation Review site. It is also a Local Wildlife Site.

This is the only known site to expose beach deposits of the late Pliocene and early Pleistocene Red Crag Formation. It has beach cobbles and fossils from a littoral fauna, whereas other Red Crag sites have deposits from deeper water facies.

The site is private land with no public access.

References

Sites of Special Scientific Interest in Suffolk
Geological Conservation Review sites